Paul Rogers (22 March 1917 – 6 October 2013) was an English actor of film, stage and television. He was the first winner of the BAFTA TV Award Best Actor in 1955 and won a Tony Award for Best Performance by a Leading Actor in a Play for The Homecoming in 1967.

Early life and career
Paul Rogers was born in Plympton, Devon, and attended Newton Abbot Grammar School. He later trained at the Michael Chekhov Theatre Studio at Dartington Hall. From 1940 to 1946 he served in the Royal Navy during World War II, before returning to acting at the Bristol Old Vic.

He went on to appear in many West End and Broadway productions, and won the Tony for Best Actor for his role in Harold Pinter's play The Homecoming in 1967. He played the role of Sir in the first Broadway production of Ronald Harwood's play The Dresser.

Later career
Rogers was a long-serving member of the Royal Shakespeare Company. His most notable performances with the Company included Nick Bottom in A Midsummer Night's Dream and Sir John Falstaff in Henry IV parts 1 and 2.

His film appearances include Beau Brummel (1954), Our Man in Havana (1959), The Trials of Oscar Wilde (1960), Billy Budd (1962), The Third Secret (1964), The Shoes of the Fisherman (1968), A Midsummer Night's Dream (1968), Three Into Two Won't Go (1969), The Looking Glass War (1970), The Homecoming (1973) and Oscar and Lucinda (1997).

He also appeared frequently on television, in productions such as Romeo and Juliet on Producers' Showcase and Public Eye.

Personal life
Paul Rogers was married to Muriel Jocelyn Maire Wynne, by whom he had two children. His second marriage was to Rosalind Boxall, by whom he also had two children. He and Rosalind remained married until her death in 2004. He died in London in 2013, aged 96.

Selected filmography 

 Murder in the Cathedral (1951)
 The Beachcomber (1954) - Rev. Owen Jones
 Beau Brummel (1954) - William Pitt
 Svengali (1954) - Taffy
 Our Man in Havana (1959) - Hubert Carter
 The Trials of Oscar Wilde (1960) - Frank Harris
 A Circle of Deception (1960) - Maj. William Spence
 No Love for Johnnie (1961) - Sydney Johnson
 The Mark (1961) - Roy Milne
 The Pot Carriers (1962) - Governor
 Life for Ruth (1962) - Counsel Hart Jacobs
 The Wild and the Willing (1962) - Prof. George Chown
 Billy Budd (1962) - Philip Seymour - First Lieutenant
 Stolen Hours (1963) - Dr. Eric McKenzie
 The Third Secret (1964) - Dr. Milton Gillen
 He Who Rides a Tiger (1965) - Supt. Taylor
 Decline and Fall... of a Birdwatcher (1968) - Chief Warder
 The Shoes of the Fisherman (1968) - Augustinian
 A Midsummer Night's Dream (1968) - Bottom
 Three Into Two Won't Go (1969) - Jack Roberts
 The Looking Glass War (1970) - Haldane
 The Reckoning (1970) - John Hazlitt
 I Want What I Want (1972) - Mr. Waites
 The Homecoming (1973) - Max
 Lost in the Stars (1974) - James Jarvis
 The Abdication (1974) - Altieri
 Mister Quilp (1975) - Single Gent / Henry Trent
 Nothing Lasts Forever (1984) - Hugo
 Oscar and Lucinda (1997) - Gambling Steward (final film role)

References

External links
 
 Notice of Paul Rogers' death
 Obituary - Telegraph
 Obituary - New York Times

1917 births
2013 deaths
Best Actor BAFTA Award (television) winners
English male film actors
English male stage actors
English male television actors
People from Plympton
Royal Navy personnel of World War II
20th-century English male actors
Royal Shakespeare Company members
English male Shakespearean actors
Tony Award winners
Male actors from Devon